Antoni Kukliński (2 June 1927 – 8 August 2015) was a Polish professor of economics specializing in economic geography and research policy. From 1967 to 1971 he was director of regional research program at UNRISD (United Nations Research Institute for Social Development). He was a founder of the Centre for European Regional and Local Studies (EUROREG) at the University of Warsaw, Poland.

In 1999, a collection of 30 papers was published to celebrate Kukliński's work and career.

Selected works

Articles

References

1927 births
2015 deaths
Polish economists
Polish geographers
Academic staff of the University of Warsaw